Georgetown Township is one of five townships in Floyd County, Indiana. As of the 2010 census, its population was 9,632 and it contained 3,733 housing units.

History
The Beard-Kerr Farm was listed on the National Register of Historic Places in 2012.

Geography
Indian Creek runs through Georgetown Township originating from Galena, Indiana to the northeast.

Cities and towns
 Georgetown

Unincorporated towns
 Duncan
 Edwardsville

Adjacent townships
 Lafayette Township (northeast)
 New Albany Township (east)
 Franklin Township (southeast)
 Franklin Township, Harrison County (southwest)
 Jackson Township, Harrison County (west)
 Greenville Township (northwest)

Major highways
 Interstate 64
 Indiana State Road 11
 Indiana State Road 62
 Indiana State Road 64

References
 
 United States Census Bureau cartographic boundary files

External links
 Indiana Township Association
 United Township Association of Indiana

Townships in Floyd County, Indiana
Townships in Indiana